Parker's antbird (Cercomacroides parkeri) is a species of passerine bird in the family Thamnophilidae. It is endemic to Colombia.

Parker's antbird was described by the American ornithologist Gary Graves in 1997 and given the binomial name Cercomacra parkeri. The specific name was chosen to honour the American ornithologist Theodore A. Parker III (1953—1993). A molecular phylogenetic study published in 2014 found that the genus Cercomacra was polyphyletic. The genus was therefore split to create two monophyletic genera and six species including Parker's antbird were moved to the newly erected genus Cercomacroides.

References

Parker's antbird
Birds of the Colombian Andes
Endemic birds of Colombia
Parker's antbird
Taxonomy articles created by Polbot